Mesteñeros, or mustang runners, were people in Western North America in the 19th and early 20th century, usually vaqueros or cowboys, that caught, broke and drove wild horses, called mesteños or mustangs, to market in the Spanish and later Mexican, and still later American territories of what is now Northern Mexico, Texas, New Mexico and California.  These Mesteñeros operated primarily in the Great Plains from Texas and New Mexico from the 18th century and in California, primarily in the San Joaquin Valley during the 19th century and in the Great Basin during the 20th century.

References

Animal husbandry occupations
History of the American West
History of the Great Basin
History of the San Joaquin Valley
Horse-related professions and professionals
Spanish words and phrases